Jongno District is a district in central Seoul, South Korea. It takes its name from a major local street, Jongno, which means "Bell Road".

Characteristics

Jongno District has been the center of the city for 600 years, since it is where the Joseon dynasty established its capital city. Jongno District is commonly referred to as the face and heart of Korea because of its important roles in the politics, economics, culture, and history as the capital city. Jongno District is home to palaces in which the kings used to reside and work, such as Gyeongbok Palace, Changdeok Palace, Changgyeonggung and Unhyeon Palace. The South Korean president's former residence, the Cheongwadae, is also located in the Jongno District.

Due to its rich history, Jongno District attracts visitors and tourists, especially those interested in Korean history and culture. These include the restored Cheonggyecheon stream, the traditional neighborhood of Insa-dong, and the Jongmyo shrine. Art Center Nabi and Gahoe Museum, a relics museum is also located in the district. A number of colleges and universities are located here; these include the main campuses of Sungkyunkwan University and Baehwa Women's College.

Jongno District is also home to Jogyesa, the chief temple of the Jogye Order of Korean Buddhism.

The area is also home to the Gwanghwamun Plaza, a public open space on Sejongno, and is part of the Seoul Metropolitan Government's plans for environmentally friendly renovation projects such as the Cheonggye Stream and Seoul Plaza. It is also of historical significant as the location for royal administrative buildings and features statue of the Admiral Yi Sun-sin of Joseon Dynasty and statue of King Sejong the Great of Joseon.

History

Etymology
In Korean, the name 'Jongno' means Bell Street. Jongno district is named after the road Jongno, which is a major trunk road running through the center of the district. The bell in question refers to Bosingak belfry, which sits at Jonggak intersection, on Jongno road.

Hanyang

Jongno district was historically the center of Joseon & latterly the Korean Empire and retained its prominence in the modern era after the establishment of the Republic of Korea. Hanyang, the capital of Joseon, included Jongno district and Jung district.
In October, 1394 (the third year of King Taejo's reign), Taejo Lee Seong-gye moved his capital from Gaegyeong to Hanyang. The capital of Goryeo, Gaegyeong, had a strong base of traditional forces against Lee Seong-gye. In addition, the topography divination theory states that the new dynasty was unlucky due to its failure, and that it also moved to Hanyang with regard to water transport of rice and military geographical conditions.
Following the relocation of the capital city, the Joseon government pushed for the construction of Hanyang, starting with the construction of Jongmyo. The construction of the main palace, Gyeongbok Palace and the separate palace, Changdeok Palace was done. In 1395, it was renamed as Hanyang Department. In 1399 (the first year of King Jeongjong's reign), the capital was moved to Gagyeong for a while because of the Prince's rebellion but, in 1405 (the fifth year of King Taejong's reign), the capital changed back to Hanyang. The city grew into a large city with about 200,000 people at King Sejong's time.

Economy

As the traditional heart of Seoul, Jongno's central location continues to attract both local and foreign businesses to set up offices there and remains an important business district. Notable companies based in Jongno include Kumho Asiana Group, Kyobo Life, Lotte Group, SK Group, Hyundai Engineering & Construction, Daewoo E&C, Daelim Group, East Asia Daily and many more. The district also features numerous major business centers and office buildings housing businesses as well as diplomatic missions.

The headquarters of South Korean skincare retailer The Face Shop is located in the LG Gwanghwamun Building on Sinmunno 2-ga.

The head office of Air Seoul is in the Kumho Asiana Main Tower in Sinmunno 1-ga, Jongro Gu.

Culture and tourism

Tourism plays a major role in the district's economy. Several of the most well-known attractions are located in the district, as is Gwanghwamun Plaza which attracts huge numbers of tourists every year given its central location. In addition, the tourist areas of Insa-Dong and Bukchon Hanok Village also attract huge numbers of visitors. Another popular tourist destination is Gwangjang Market, previously called Dongdaemun Market. It is one of the oldest traditional markets in the country and is visited by approximately 65,000 each day.

Politics and government

Jongno district is considered as the most important district in South Korean politics, as it is located in the heart of Seoul, and thus in the heart of the Republic of Korea. The district is the home to the official residence of the President, the Blue House, and two of the three largest plazas in Seoul (the first being Gwanghwamun Plaza, and the other Cheonggye Plaza), making the district the first constituency to appear in the National Election Commission's election statistics, and in exit polls for every nationwide election. Because of the significance in politics the district has, every political party carefully selects its own candidate to run in every election, and even most minor parties nominate their candidates to run in the district while they choose not to nominate candidates in other constituencies in Seoul.

Jongno has elected three presidents to represent it in the National Assembly: Yun Posun, Roh Moo-hyun and Lee Myung-bak. Although Jongno is named as 'district', but its residents are entitled to elect their own mayor and form their own district council, as 25 districts in Seoul——including Jongno——have city-equivalent status. The City of Seoul has province-equivalent status and its mayor is regarded as a cabinet-minister-level position. The mayorship is regarded as a higher position than any other provincial governors, as these positions are regarded as deputy minister level positions.

Traditionally, the district has been regarded as a Conservative stronghold riding in Seoul, since Seoul natives and rich people used to form a majority in terms of resident numbers in towns such as Pyeongchang, Samcheong-dong, Sajik-dong, Jongro 1 and 4. However, as Democrats gradually gained power in the Sudogwon region in the 2010s, and eventually making the region their stronghold, the party also gained power in the district,  thanks to the votes of Sungkyunkwan University students in Hyehwa-dong and residents of relatively lower income in towns such as Changsin-dong and Sungin-dong.

As of June 2020, the district is regarded as Democratic stronghold, as are many other constituencies in Seoul. The district is represented by Lee Nak-yon, a Democrat, former Prime Minister and now the leader of his party; the city government led by Kim Yeong-jong, a three-term mayor serving since July 2010 and also a Democrat.

The headquarters of the Ministry of Security and Public Administration is located in the Seoul Government Complex in Jongno District. The third and fourth floors of the same building house the Ministry of Unification.

The headquarters of the Ministry of Foreign Affairs is located in the MOFA Building in Jongno District.

Previously the Ministry of Education had its headquarters in the Central Government Complex in Jongno District. The Ministry of Culture, Sports and Tourism also had its headquarters in Jongno District. The Ministry of Health and Welfare had its headquarters in the Hyundai Building. The offices of those ministries have moved to Sejong City.

Before merged into another ministry in 2008, the Ministry of Maritime Affairs and Fisheries was located in Jongro-gu. It was re-established in Sejong City.

Diplomatic missions

Being at the center of the city, the district hosts numerous foreign embassies.

District Council
The district council serves administrative functions such as Foreign Seal Registration, International Marriage, Adoption, Acknowledgement reports and Alien Registration Certificates for foreigners residing in Jongno District. In year 2022, current mayor of Jongno District is Chung, Moon Hun.

Subdivisions

Those are some of the district administrative dongs (행정동). For a complete list, see here.

Attractions

Education
 Universities
 Catholic University of Korea, Songsin Campus (Private)
 Sangmyung University (Private)
 Sungkyunkwan University (Private)
 Seoul National University, Yeongeon Campus (Public)
 University of North Korean Studies (Private)

 High schools
 Kyungbock High School (Public)
 Seoul Arts High School (Private)
 Seoul Science High School (Public)

 International schools
 Lycée International Xavier (Private) : Available for both elementary and secondary education.
 Seoul Global High School (Public)

Sister cities
 From 1995, Dongcheng District, Beijing, People's Republic of China
 From 1996, Sükhbaatar District, Ulaanbaatar, Mongolia
 From 1999, Lancaster, Pennsylvania, United States
 From 2013, San Miguel de Allende, Guanajuato, Mexico
 From 2015, Prague 1 Municipal District, Czech Republic

See also

Geography of South Korea
Subdivisions of South Korea

References

External links
District government website, in English

 
Districts of Seoul